The 1995 South Pacific Games was the 10th edition where football was introduced, and was held  in Tahiti during August 1995.

Group Phase

Group A

Group B

Semi finals

Bronze medal match

Gold medal match

External links
Details on RSSSF website

1995
Football at the Pacific Games
Pac
Pacific Games
1995 Pacific Games